Beta-1,3-galactosyl-O-glycosyl-glycoprotein beta-1,6-N-acetylglucosaminyltransferase is an enzyme that in humans is encoded by the GCNT1 gene.

This gene is a member of the beta-1,6-N-acetylglucosaminyltransferase gene family. It is essential to the formation of Gal beta 1-3(GlcNAc beta 1-6)GalNAc structures and the core 2 O-glycan branch. The gene coding this enzyme was originally mapped to 9q21, but was later localized to 9q13. Multiple alternatively spliced variants, encoding the same protein, have been identified.

References

Further reading